The 2016 FC Ordabasy season is their 14th season in the Kazakhstan Premier League, the highest tier of association football in Kazakhstan, following their promotion from to the Kazakhstan First Division in 2003. Ordabasy will also play in the UEFA Europa League and Kazakhstan Cup.

Squad

Out on loan

Transfers

Winter

In:

Out:

Trialists:

Summer

In:

 

Out:

Friendlies

Competitions

Kazakhstan Premier League

Regular season

Results summary

Results by round

Results

League table

Championship round

Results summary

Results by round

Results

League table

Kazakhstan Cup

UEFA Europa League

Qualifying rounds

Squad statistics

Appearances and goals

|-
|colspan=14|Players away from Ordabasy on loan:

|-
|colspan=14|Players who appeared for Ordabasy that left during the season:

Goal scorers

Disciplinary record

References

External links
Official website
Official VK

FC Ordabasy seasons
Ordabasy